Daphne Walker (born c. 1924) is a British retired figure skater. She is the 1939 World bronze medalist and 1947 silver medalist, and the 1939 & 1947 European bronze medalist.

Walker almost drowned in Brighton in 1947, but was rescued by American William Keefe. The pair married in London in 1948.

Results

References

 
 

British female single skaters
1920s births
Possibly living people
World Figure Skating Championships medalists
European Figure Skating Championships medalists